The 69th Writers Guild of America Awards honor the best in film, television, radio and video-game writing of 2016. Winners were announced on February 19, 2017 at Beverly Hilton Hotel, Beverly Hills, California. The nominations for Television, New Media, Radio, News and Promotional Writing were announced on December 5, 2016, while, the Theatrical and Documentary Screenplay nominees were announced on January 4, 2017, and the Videogame Writing nominees was announced on January 12, 2017.

The show was hosted by Patton Oswalt.

Nominees

Film

Television

Documentary

News

Radio

Promotional Writing

Videogaming Writing

References

External links 
 Official Site

2016
2016 film awards
2016 in American cinema
2016 in American television
2016 television awards
2016 guild awards
2016 awards in the United States
February 2017 events in the United States